The 1912 Delaware Fightin' Blue Hens football team, also known as "Old Delaware" and the "Main Line team", was an American football team that represented Delaware College (later renamed the University of Delaware) as an independent during the 1912 college football season. In its fifth season under head coach William McAvoy, the team compiled a 1–6–1 record and was outscored by a total of 121 to 50. Arthur C. Huston was the team captain. The team played its home games in Newark, Delaware.

Schedule

References

Delaware
Delaware Fightin' Blue Hens football seasons
Delaware Fightin' Blue Hens football